Eimmart is a lunar impact crater that is located near the east-northeastern limb of the Moon, to the northeast of the Mare Crisium. The northern and eastern outer rim of this crater borders on the narrow Mare Anguis. To the northwest of Eimmart are the smaller crater Delmotte and the prominent Cleomedes.

The rim of this crater has been lightly eroded, especially along the south-southeastern portion, but most of the edge remains intact. The small crater Eimmart A lies along the eastern rim, and is surrounded by a skirt of higher albedo material, particularly to the south and west across the interior of Eimmart. The interior floor is relatively level, and is marked by the ray material from Eimmart A.

Satellite craters
By convention these features are identified on lunar maps by placing the letter on the side of the crater midpoint that is closest to Eimmart.

References

 
 
 
 
 
 
 
 
 
 
 
 

Impact craters on the Moon